Holiday Island is an unincorporated 4,500 acre planned retirement and vacation community, and census-designated place (CDP) in Carroll County, Arkansas, United States. As of the 2020 census, the population was 2,533. Holiday Island is located in the Ozark Mountains on Table Rock Lake near Eureka Springs, Arkansas and only and hour from Branson, Missouri, Fayetteville, Arkansas, and Bentonville, Arkansas. Community Growth has be fueled by the expansion of the corporate giants headquartered in Northwest Arkansas (including WalMart, Tyson Foods, and J.B. Hunt), the entertainment attractions in Eureka Springs and Branson, the visitor traffic from the Crystal Bridges Museum of American Art, Pea Ridge National Military Park, and Roaring River State Park, and the influence of the state's largest University, the University of Arkansas.

Resort amenities include Lake Accesses, a Shopping Center, Tennis courts, Pickleball courts, Miniature golf, Horseshoe pits, Basketball courts, Softball field, Table & paddle tennis, Shuffleboard, Two swimming pools, Picnic pavilion, Campground, Marina, Boat & RV storage, Clubhouse and Recreation Center, 9 hole executive golf course, 18 hole golf course, and hiking/biking trails. The facilities host Wedding Receptions, Gala Events, Holiday Celebrations, Family & Class Reunions, Jamborees & Festivals, Spiritual Retreats, and Company Picnics

The community has three fire stations, a Fire Chief, and two full-time firefighters/EMTs with a volunteer crew of twenty-five firefighters/emergency medical care personnel. The District contracts with the Carroll County Sheriff's Office to provide year-round security.

Holiday Island Suburban Improvement District (HISID) was formed in 1970 by the Holly Corporation in collaboration with McCulloch Oil Corporation under Title 14, Subtitle 5, Chapter 92 of the Arkansas Code (“Suburban Improvement Districts”). The HISID’s formation was to provide water, sewer, waste management, and fire services to Holiday Island property owners, and to maintain roads and recreational facilities in Holiday Island. McCulloch sold the developer rights in 1990 to manager Tom Dees. Amenities are provided and maintained by the Holiday Island Suburban Improvement District [HISID] through the collection of annual assessments.

Qualified electors within the new boundaries of Holiday Island voted to approve incorporation as the Town of Holiday Island on Nov. 3, 2020. The Carroll County Judge ordered the town organized (INCORPORATED TOWN) on Dec. 3, 2020. On March 23, 2021, the Secretary of State elevated Holiday Island to a City of the 2nd Class. Newly elected city officials will begin to set up the city government, establish zoning and planning ordinances and work toward establishing voting wards for the next general election in 2022.

A partnership with the Holiday Island Suburban Improvement District [HISID] will exist until the city can support services independently when the tax base grows to a sufficient level. The city will be able to provide services that HISID cannot provide or does not have the resources to provide.

The city will begin to receive its share of Arkansas and County sales taxes, road taxes, property taxes and turnback funds in 2021 based upon population of full-time residents. Those revenues will enable the town to provide an economically sustainable way to better take care of the aging infrastructure in Holiday Island, preserve the lifestyle that the original developers envisioned, and assure proper standards are met for development and growth.

The location in the Ozarks allows for four seasons that include mild winters and summers.

Demographics

2020 census

Note: the US Census treats Hispanic/Latino as an ethnic category. This table excludes Latinos from the racial categories and assigns them to a separate category. Hispanics/Latinos can be of any race.

References

External links
Holiday Island Suburban Improvement District
City of Holiday Island

Census-designated places in Carroll County, Arkansas
Census-designated places in Arkansas